Subancistrocerus is an Australian, Indomalayan, African and Palearctic genus of potter wasps. Males of this genus used to have an enlarged antennal tip.

Species
The following species are members of the genus Subancistrocerus:
 
Subancistrocerus abdominalis Giordani Soika, 1994
Subancistrocerus albocinctus Giordani Soika, 1993
Subancistrocerus angulatus Giordani Soika, 1994
Subancistrocerus bambogensis Giordani Soika, 1981
Subancistrocerus budongo (Meade-Waldo, 1915)
Subancistrocerus burensis (Giordani Soika, 1935)
Subancistrocerus camicrus (Cameron, 1904)
Subancistrocerus clavicornis (Smith, 1859)
Subancistrocerus domesticus Williams, 1928
Subancistrocerus esakii Bequard & Yasu., 1939
Subancistrocerus giordanii Castro, 2003
Subancistrocerus imbecillus Saussure, 1852
Subancistrocerus indochinensis Gusenleitner, 2000
Subancistrocerus kankauensis Schulthess, 1934
Subancistrocerus massaicus (Cameron, 1910)
Subancistrocerus monstricornis Giordani Soika, 1941
Subancistrocerus nigritus Giordani Soika & Kojima, 1995
Subancistrocerus obiensis Giordani Soika, 1995
Subancistrocerus palauensis Bequard & Yasu., 1939
Subancistrocerus redemptus Giordani Soika, 1965
Subancistrocerus reflexus Giordani Soika, 1995
Subancistrocerus sichelii (Saussure, 1856)
Subancistrocerus similis Giordani Soika, 1995
Subancistrocerus solomonis Giordani Soika, 1981
Subancistrocerus spinicollis Giordani Soika, 1995
Subancistrocerus spinithorax Giordani Soika, 1995
Subancistrocerus thalassarctos (Dalla Torre, 1889)
Subancistrocerus tristis Giordani Soika, 1992
Subancistrocerus yapensis Yas., 1945

References

Hymenoptera genera
Potter wasps